Frank Sinatra Sings the Select Johnny Mercer is a 1995 compilation album by Frank Sinatra, that has him singing the songs written by Johnny Mercer.

Track listing
 All songs written by Johnny Mercer.

 "Too Marvelous for Words" (Johnny Mercer, Richard A. Whiting) - 2:29
 "Day In, Day Out" [Ballad Version] (Mercer, Rube Bloom) - 3:19
 "Laura" (Mercer, David Raksin) - 3:28
 "Jeepers Creepers" (Mercer, Harry Warren) - 2:24
 "Blues in the Night" (Mercer, Harold Arlen) - 4:44
 "Something's Gotta Give" (Mercer) - 2:38
 "Fools Rush In (Where Angels Fear to Tread)" (Mercer, Bloom) - 3:22
 "P.S. I Love You" (Mercer, Gordon Jenkins) - 4:21
 "(Ah, the Apple Trees) When the World Was Young" (Mercer, M. Philippe-Gerard, Angele Marie T. Vannier) - 3:47
 "That Old Black Magic" (Merer, Arlen) - 4:05
 "Autumn Leaves" (Mercer, Jacques Prévert, Joseph Kosma) - 2:52
 "I Thought About You" (Mercer, Jimmy Van Heusen) - 2:30
 "Dream" (Mercer) - 2:57
 "Day In - Day Out" [Swingin' Version] - 3:25
 "One for My Baby (and One More for the Road)" (Mercer, Arlen) - 4:23

1995 compilation albums
Frank Sinatra compilation albums
Johnny Mercer tribute albums